The Mauritius Prisons Service Long Service and Good Conduct Medal was awarded by the Dominion of Mauritius between 1968 and 1992 to staff of the Mauritius Prisons Service who completed eighteen years service.

Establishment
On 12 March 1968 Mauritius, until then a British colony, became an independent Dominion within the Commonwealth, retaining Queen Elizabeth II as Head of State with the title Queen of Mauritius. This constitutional change required the replacement of a number of colonial era awards, including the Colonial Prison Service Medal which, by a Royal Warrant, was replaced by the Mauritius Prisons Service Long Service and Good Conduct Medal. The award became defunct when Mauritius became a republic within the Commonwealth on 12 March 1992.

The medal, which is worn after coronation and jubilee medals, appears in the British order of wear.

Description
The obverse has the Queen's effigy, designed by Cecil Thomas, with the inscription 'QUEEN ELIZABETH II'. The reverse is similar to the earlier Colonial Prison Service Medal, and shows a phoenix rising out of flames and flying upwards toward the sun. Above are the words, MAURITIUS PRISON SERVICE and below FOR LONG SERVICE & GOOD CONDUCT. The ribbon is red with a central white stripe and is worn from a ring suspender. Each medal was inscribed with the recipient's details on the edge.

It was manufactured by the British Royal Mint.

Award criteria
The medal was awarded to staff of the Mauritius Prisons Service who completed eighteen years service. Previous service in a colonial prison service could count. Clasps were granted for twenty-five and thirty years service. In undress, when only ribbons are worn, these clasps are represented by silver rosettes attached to the ribbon.

See also
 Mauritius Police Long Service and Good Conduct Medal
 Mauritius Fire Services Long Service and Good Conduct Medal

References

Awards established in 1968
Awards disestablished in 1992
Long and Meritorious Service Medals of Britain and the Commonwealth
Civil awards and decorations of the United Kingdom
Long service medals
Prison officer awards
1968 establishments in Mauritius
1992 disestablishments in Mauritius
 Mauritius and the Commonwealth of Nations
Orders, decorations, and medals of Mauritius
Military awards and decorations of the United Kingdom